Saint-Damase-de-L'Islet is a municipality in Quebec, Canada, with a population of about 600 people nestled in the Appalachian mountains. It is named after the Pope Damasus I and Damase Ouellet (1826–1908), which is known as the pioneer of the town.

The town was first named "Municipalité du canton d'Ashford" in 1898 and got its current name in 1955.

It is known for its local Chicken Festival every September.

See also
 List of municipalities in Quebec

References

External links 
 

Municipalities in Quebec
Incorporated places in Chaudière-Appalaches